Alexander Lynn Collins (March 17, 1812 – October 31, 1901) was an American lawyer, judge, and politician.  He was an important leader of the Whig Party in the early years of Wisconsin, serving as party chairman, nominee for United States Congress, for United States Senate, and for Governor of Wisconsin.  He also served as a Wisconsin Circuit Court Judge and a member of the University of Wisconsin Board of Regents.  In historical documents, his middle name is sometimes spelled "Linn" and he is sometimes referred to as "A. L. Collins."

Early life and education

Alexander L. Collins was born in Whitestown, New York, to Oliver Collins and his fourth wife, Catharine (Kellogg) Collins.  His father was a farmer and had been a volunteer in the Continental Army during the American Revolutionary War.  Oliver Collins rose to the rank of Brigadier General with the New York militia during the War of 1812.  Alexander was the tenth of twelve children fathered by Oliver Collins.

At the age of 19, he began studying law in the office of Storrs and White, in Whitesboro, New York.  In 1833, at age 21, he moved to Cleveland, Ohio, and continued his legal studies.  He was admitted to the State Bar in 1835, at the Supreme Court of Ohio.

Wisconsin politics

Collins practiced law in Cleveland for several years, then moved to the Wisconsin Territory in 1842, settling in Madison.  He continued his law practice there, first establishing a brief partnership with Thomas W. Sutherland, who had been the United States Attorney for the Wisconsin Territory.  He soon moved into a longer term legal partnership with George Baldwin Smith, and, after 1853, with Elisha W. Keyes, through which Collins became a prominent and well-respected lawyer in the state.  Some of his siblings also relocated to Wisconsin—his older sister, Sarah, was the wife of Wisconsin Territorial Governor James Duane Doty.

In 1846, Collins was elected to his first public office when he was chosen to represent Dane, Green, and Sauk counties on the Territorial Council.  He served on the council until its dissolution, at the time Wisconsin became a state.

In Wisconsin's first election for voting members of Congress, Collins was the Whig Party's candidate in the 2nd Congressional district.  He was defeated in that election by Democrat Mason C. Darling.  After the seating of the 1st Wisconsin Legislature, Collins stood, along with Edward V. Whiton, as Whig candidates for United States Senate—U.S. senators at the time were elected by the state legislature, rather than through popular election.  The Democratic Party had a clear majority in the Legislature, thus Collins and Whiton were defeated by the Democratic Party ticket of Henry Dodge and Isaac P. Walker. Later that year, Collins was appointed to the first board of regents of the University of Wisconsin.  Whiton went on to service on the Wisconsin Circuit Court, and later became the first chief justice of the Wisconsin Supreme Court.

The following year, in 1849, Collins was the Whig Party's nominee in the 2nd Wisconsin gubernatorial election, running against incumbent governor Nelson Dewey.  Collins was defeated and Dewey went onto another term as governor.  Two years later, in 1851, Collins was, again, the Whig nominee for United States Senator, running against incumbent Democrat Henry Dodge.  The Democratic Party still held a significant majority in the 1851 legislature, thus re-elected Dodge.

In 1852, Collins became chairman of the Whig Party in Wisconsin, and served as a delegate to the 1852 Whig National Convention, in Baltimore.  The 1852 convention would turn out to be the last Whig National Convention.  At the convention, Collins was a strong supporter of Daniel Webster, who had been supportive of the Compromise of 1850 and associated with the enforcement of the Fugitive Slave Act of 1850.  When the convention chose General Winfield Scott as its nominee, Collins left in disgust.

As the Whig Party dissolved into the newly forming Republican Party, Collins became briefly associated with the Democratic Party.  In 1855, with support of the Democratic Party, he was elected Circuit Court Judge for the newly created 9th Circuit.  He had to resign a few years later, in the Fall of 1858, due to health problems.

Later years

After leaving the court, he went into the land business with his brother-in-law, former Territorial Governor James D. Doty, in Menasha, Wisconsin.  At the start of the American Civil War, their business faltered, and in 1864, Collins traveled to California for health and recreation.  He returned to Wisconsin in 1867, and, in 1874, resumed his law practice in Appleton, Wisconsin.

Death

In his later years, Judge Collins resided with his son, Alexander, Jr., in Neenah, Wisconsin, and his daughter, Mrs. Jessie McCord, in Milwaukee.  He died in Neenah on October 31, 1901.

Electoral history

United States House of Representatives (1848)

| colspan="6" style="text-align:center;background-color: #e9e9e9;"| Special Election, May 8, 1848

United States Senate (1848)

| colspan="6" style="text-align:center;background-color: #e9e9e9;"| Vote of the 1st Wisconsin Legislature, June 8, 1848

Wisconsin Governor (1849)

| colspan="6" style="text-align:center;background-color: #e9e9e9;"| General Election, November 6, 1849

United States Senate (1851)

| colspan="6" style="text-align:center;background-color: #e9e9e9;"| Vote of the 4th Wisconsin Legislature, January 20, 1851

References 

1812 births
1901 deaths
Wisconsin Democrats
Wisconsin Whigs
Members of the Wisconsin Territorial Legislature
19th-century American politicians
Burials in Wisconsin
People from Whitestown, New York
Lawyers from Cleveland
Wisconsin lawyers
Wisconsin state court judges
19th-century American judges